Joachim von Beust (1522–1597) was a 16th-century German lawyer and legal author.

His most important contribution was in 1586 when he wrote the Saxon Protestant Marriage Law.

Life
He was born in Mockern near Magdeburg on 19 April 1522 the eldest son of Captain Joachim (Achim) von Beust. The family had major estates in the stendal district. From 1539 he began studying Law and the Liberal Arts at the University of Leipzig. In Leipzig he first encountered Martin Luther and came under his influence. In 1544 he went to Italy at the invitation of Modestinus Pistoris. In 1547 he did further studies in Law at the University of Bologna.

In 1550 Elector Moritz appointed him a councillor in Wittenberg also creating him a Professor of Law at Wittenberg University. From 1553 Elector August also used him for diplomatic purposes.

In 1580 he bought a manor at Planitz near Zwickau. In the 1590s he was involved in various ecclesiastical disputes.

He died in Planitz on 4 February 1597.

Family
In 1556 at Wiesenburg he married Barbara Brandt of Lindau. Only one son is known, Heinrich von Beust (b.1559).

Publications
Tractatus de Spons et matrim

References

16th-century German lawyers

1522 births
1597 deaths
People from Wittenberg